Daxing is a town under the administration of Changtu County, Liaoning, China. , it has one residential community and 10 villages under its administration.

References 

Township-level divisions of Liaoning
Changtu County